Bond is a surname of English origin. which comes from the Anglo-Saxon name Bonde or Bonda, which was brought from the Old Norse Bóndi meaning 'farmer'. Notable people with the surname include:

Bond (1810 cricketer), an English first-class cricketer
Adam Bond (born c. 1981), English actor
Alan Bond (disambiguation), multiple people
Andrew Bond (disambiguation), multiple people
Annabelle Bond (born 1969), English mountain climber
Annie B. Bond (born 1953), American writer
Arthur J. Bond (1939–2012), American academic
 Ashlee Bond (born 1985), American-Israeli Olympic show jumping rider who competes for Israel
Brian Bond (born 1936), British military historian
Brock Bond (born 1985), American baseball player
Bruce Bond (born 1954), American poet
Casey Bond (born 1984), American actor and baseball player
Cathi Bond, Canadian writer
Chad Bond (born 1987), Welsh footballer
Chrystelle Trump Bond, American dancer, choreographer and dance historian
Colin Bond (born 1942), Australian racing driver
Colin Bond (footballer) (born 1941), Australian rules footballer
Dario Bond (born 1961), Italian racing driver
Darwin Bond (born 1951), American sprinter
David Bond (disambiguation), multiple people
Denis Bond (disambiguation), multiple people
Derek Bond (1920–2006), British actor
Derek Bond (bishop) (1927–2018), English Anglican bishop
Douglas Bond (born 1958), American writer
Eddie Bond (1933–2013), American musician
Edward Bond (disambiguation), multiple people
Eleanor Bond (born 1948), Canadian artist
Eric Bond, (born 1953), American economist
Ernie Bond (born 1929), English footballer
Etta Bond (born 1989), English singer
Felicia Bond (born 1954), American writer
Francis Godolphin Bond (1765–1839), Rear-Admiral in the British Royal Navy
Frederick Bond (1811–1889), English naturalist
Frederick Bligh Bond (1864–1945), English architect
Gemma Bond (born 1982), English ballet dancer
Gerald Bond (1909–1965), South African cricketer
George Bond (disambiguation), multiple people
Gordon C. Bond (1939–1997), American historian
Graeme Bond (born 1949), Australian rules footballer
Graham Bond (1937–1974), English musician
Grahame Bond (born 1943), Australian actor
Grant Bond (born 1974), American comics artist and writer
Hamish Bond (born 1986), New Zealand rower
Helen Bond, British historian
Henry Bond (1853-1938), academic, master of Trinity Hall, Cambridge
Henry Bond (born 1966), English writer and photographer
Iain Bond (born 1973), English cricketer
Jack Bond (1932–2019), English cricketer
Jacki Bond, English singer
Jackson Bond (born 1996), American actor
James Bond (disambiguation), multiple people
Jamie Bond (footballer) (born 1971), Australian rules footballer
Jason Bond, American biologist
Jennie Bond (born 1950), English journalist and television presenter
Jim Bond (born 1936), American Nazarene church minister
Jim Bond (rugby league), New Zealand rugby league player
Jay Bond (c. 1885–1955), American college sports coach
John Bond (disambiguation), multiple people
Jonathan Bond (born 1993), English footballer
Julian Bond (1940–2015), American social activist
Justin Vivian Bond (born 1963), American singer-songwriter
Jy Bond (born 1979), American football player
Kain Bond (born 1985), English footballer
Kerry Bond (born 1945), Canadian ice hockey player
Kevin Bond (disambiguation), multiple people
Kit Bond (born 1939), American politician
Langhorne Bond (1937–2022), Administrator of the U.S. Federal Aviation Administration
Larry Bond (born 1952), American writer and video game designer
LaToya Bond (born 1984), American women's basketball player
Len Bond (born 1954), English footballer
Liam Bond (born 1970), Welsh golfer
Linda Bond (born 1946), former General of The Salvation Army
Lloyd Bond, American psychologist
Luke Bond, British organist
Michael Bond (disambiguation), multiple people
Nancy Bond (born 1945), American writer
Nigel Bond (born 1965), English snooker player
Nola Bond, New Zealand sprinter
Oliver Bond (died 1798), Irish revolutionary
Patrick Bond (born 1961), American economist
Phil Bond (born 1954), American basketball player
Philip Bond (born 1966), British comic book artist
Philip Bond (actor) (1934–2017), English actor
Raymond Bond (born 1944), English cricketer
Richard Bond (disambiguation), multiple people, including Dick and Dicky
Rose Bond, Canadian-born American animator
Ruskin Bond (born 1934), Indian author
Sam Bond (born 1983), English bodybuilder, weightlifter and television personality
Samantha Bond (born 1961), English actress
Scott Bond, British record producer
Shane Bond (disambiguation), multiple people
Sheila Bond (1928–2017), American actress
Shirley Bond, Canadian politician
Stephanie Bond (born 1981), New Zealand netball player
Stephanie Bond (born 1965), American author
Steve Bond (born 1953), Israeli American actor and model
Sudie Bond (1928-1984), American actress
Sue Bond (born 1945), British singer and actress
Susan G. Bond (born 1942), British scientific researcher and computer programmer
Tommy Bond (1926-2005), American actor
Tommy Bond (1856-1941), American baseball player
Tony Bond (rugby union) (born 1953), English rugby union player
Travis Bond (born 1990), American football player
Troy Bond (born 1973), Australian rules footballer
Victoria Bond (born 1945), American conductor and composer
Walt Bond (1937-1967), American baseball player
Walter Bond (born 1969), American basketball player
Ward Bond (1903–1960), American actor
Wayne Bond (born 1986), Papua New Guinean rugby league player
William Bond (disambiguation), multiple people
Bond baronets
Sir Thomas Bond, 1st Baronet
Sir James Bond, 1st Baronet
Chelsea Watego (born 1978/1979, formerly Bond), Aboriginal Australian academic and writer

See also
Bond family tree showing the relationship between some of the above

English-language surnames